Nikolai Borisovich Fadeyechev (27 January 1933 – 23 June 2020) was a Soviet and Russian ballet dancer and teacher. He was awarded People's Artist of the USSR in 1976.

Biography

Fadeyechev was born 27 January 1933 in Moscow, and was a retired dancer and a teacher and répétiteur of the Bolshoi Ballet. In 1952 he graduated from the Moscow Ballet School, where he had studied with Alexander Rudenko, and joined the Bolshoi Theatre, where he performed many principal roles. He made his international debut in London in 1956 with the ballet Giselle, dancing alongside Galina Ulanova. He was a regular partner with Maya Plisetskaya, Raisa Struchkova, Nina Timofeeva, Marina Kondratyeva, Natalia Bessmertnova, Ekaterina Maximova and Ludmila Semenyaka. After retiring from the stage in 1977, he became one of the most important teachers and répétiteurs of the Bolshoi Theatre. His students have included Nikolay Tsiskaridze, Andrey Uvarov, Sergei Filin, Ruslan Skvortsov and Artem Ovcharenko.

Personal life
He was married to Irina Kholina, a ballerina, and had two sons: , a choreographer for the Bolshoi, and Aleksandr. On June 23, 2020, Fadeyechev died of heart failure in Moscow, at 87 years of age.

Repertoire 
 Swan Lake: Prince Siegfried 
 The Sleeping Beauty: Prince Désiré, Bluebird
 Nutcracker Suite: Prince, Mouse King 
 Giselle: Albrecht
 Raimonda: Jean de Brienne, Bernard, grand pas
 Les Sylphides (called Chopiniana in the Bolshoi production): Soloist
 Romeo and Juliet: Romeo
 The Fountain of Bakhchisarai: Vatslav
 Laurencia: Frondoso, Youth
 Gayane: Armen
 The Stone Flower: Danila (first interpreter at the Bolshoi Theater), Opal
 The Firebird (L’oiseau de feu): Prince Ivan (first interpreter at the Bolshoi Theater)
 Spartacus: Harmodius (first interpreter)
 Carmen Suite: José (first interpreter)
 Anna Karenina: Karenin (first interpreter)
 Asel: Ilyas (first interpreter)
 Prelude: Soloist (first interpreter)
 Class Concert: Soloist

See also
 List of Russian ballet dancers

External links 

 Fadeyechev's page on the Bolshoi Theatre web site
 
 
 Page Fadeyechev's on The Gallery of Masters of Musical Theatre

References 

1933 births
2020 deaths
20th-century Russian ballet dancers
Dancers from Moscow
Ballet teachers
Bolshoi Ballet principal dancers
Honored Artists of the RSFSR
People's Artists of the RSFSR
People's Artists of the USSR
Recipients of the Order of Honour (Russia)
Recipients of the Order of the Red Banner of Labour
Russian male ballet dancers
Soviet male ballet dancers
Burials at Novodevichy Cemetery